Annicet Bitoumbou (born 2 February 1980) is a Congolese former footballer who played as a defender. He made ten appearances for the Congo national team from 1998 to 2000. He was also named in Congo's squad for the 2000 African Cup of Nations tournament.

References

1980 births
Living people
Republic of the Congo footballers
Association football defenders
Republic of the Congo international footballers
2000 African Cup of Nations players
Place of birth missing (living people)